The Tucker County Courthouse and Jail in Parsons, West Virginia was built between 1898 and 1900 in a combination of Flemish Renaissance and Romanesque Revival styles. The red pressed-brick structure is flanked by a "jail and jailer's residence" built in 1896 in a similar style.

The main courthouse was designed by architect Frank P. Milburn and built by P.O. Shrake.  Milburn was a prolific designer of courthouses in West Virginia and across the southern United States. The jail was designed by Franzeim, Geisey and Faris and was built by William D. Bumgarner.

The Tucker County Courthouse was established in the wake of the Tucker County Seat War (1893). The historic jail is no longer used to confine inmates.  Since 2005 the Tygart Valley Regional Jail in Randolph County has also served Tucker County.

See also
 Tucker County, West Virginia

References

Courthouses on the National Register of Historic Places in West Virginia
Renaissance Revival architecture in West Virginia
Government buildings completed in 1900
Buildings and structures in Tucker County, West Virginia
County courthouses in West Virginia
Frank Pierce Milburn buildings
Romanesque Revival architecture in West Virginia
County government buildings in West Virginia
Clock towers in West Virginia
National Register of Historic Places in Tucker County, West Virginia
Jails on the National Register of Historic Places in West Virginia